Haugbrot was an album released in 2001 by the Icelandic rock singer Megas. The album contained 14 songs and featured Guðlaugur Kristinn Óttarsson on guitar.

Track listing

External links
Page about Megas at Tónlist.com - features discography with mp3 samples.
Official site of Guðlaugur Kristinn Óttarsson
Page of G. K. Óttarsson at MySpace.com

2001 albums
Megas albums